The Coosa darter (Etheostoma coosae) is a species of freshwater ray-finned fish, a darter from the subfamily Etheostomatinae, part of the family Percidae, which also contains the perches, ruffes and pikeperches. It is endemic to the eastern United States.

Description
The Coosa darter is a robust species of darter which can be identified by having a blunt snout with a small mouth. The spiny part of its dorsal fin is marked with bands of color and has a central red band along the whole of its length, although it does not possess the anterior ocellus found in many other species in the subgenus Ulocentra. Above and below this central band there are alternating clear and dark bans. In the soft-rayed part of the dorsal fin, the middle part of the membranes between each ray is red. The color of the body is yellow-olive, marked with 8-9 dark blotches located dorsally and on the flanks. The lower snout and the throat are pale green, while the anal fin and upper and lower lobes of the caudal fin are turquoise. The blotches along the flank have a slightly green hue.

Distribution
The Coosa darter is only found in the Coosa River system, which drains into Mobile Bay in Georgia, Alabama and Tennessee.

Habitat and biology
The Coosa darter is found in rocky pools and nearby riffles of creeks and small to medium rivers, as well as in streams. It feeds mainly on the larvae of midge and blackfly larvae, with smaller amounts of cladocera, copepods, mayfly nymphs, and caddisfly larvae. Insects, especially flies, are more important in summer and crustaceans become more important in the winter. The Coosa darter is known to spawn from mid-March to mid-May. The female lays a single egg at a time, placing it in small cracks and crevices in wood, rocks, or other hard substrates. The male fertilizes the eggs as soon as they are laid. They may spawn in any position from horizontal to vertical.

Taxonomy
The Coosa darter was first formally described as Poecilichthys coosae in 1945 by the American ichthyologist Henry Weed Fowler (1878-1965) with the type locality given as a small creek in the Coosa River drainage within Cherokee County, Alabama, near the settlement of Chesterfield.

Status
The IUCN has listed this species as being of "Least Concern" because it has an extensive range in the Coosa River system, has a large total population size, and has numerous subpopulations. In general, the population trend seems stable and no major threats have been identified.

References

O'Neal, P. "Life history of the Etheostoma-coosae Pisces Percidae in Barbaree Creek Alabama U.S.." Tulane Studies in Zoology and Botany. 23.1 (1981): 75-84. Web. 23 Sep. 2013.
https://web.archive.org/web/20111002015239/http://www.bio.utk.edu/hulseylab/Fishlist.html
Ryon, Michael G. "The life history and ecology of Etheostoma trisella (Pisces: Percidae)." American Midland Naturalist (1986): 73-86.
Brogdon, Stephen M., Christopher R. Tabit, and Leos G. Kral. "Population structure of the Tallapoosa darter (Etheostoma tallapoosae)." Southeastern Naturalist 2.4 (2003): 487-498.
Bart, Henry L. "Spawning behavior of Etheostoma davisoni Hay." Copeia 1992.2 (1992): 537-539.
Storey, Casey Michael. Genetic population structure and life history aspects of the federally threatened Cherokee darter, Etheostoma scotti. Diss. uga, 2003.

Etheostoma
Fish described in 1945